Themba Zwane (born 3 August 1989) is a South African professional soccer player who plays as an attacking midfielder for Premier Soccer League club Mamelodi Sundowns and the South Africa.

Honours

At Mamelodi Sundowns 
Domestic
South African Premier Division: (7) 2013-14; 2015-16;  2017-18; 2018-19;  2019-20;  2020-21;  2021-22
Telkom Knockout:(2)  2015; 2019

Nedbank Cup (3): 2014-15; 2019-20; 2021-22

 MTN 8: 2021

Continental 
CAF Champions League : 2016
 CAF Super Cup : 2017

Friendly honours
'Carling Black Label Cup: 
Winner: 2022
Individual honours
2019-20 PSL Footballer Of the Season
2019-20 PSL Player's Player of the season
2019-20 PSL Midfielder of the Season
2019-20 Sundowns Player of the season 
2019-20 Sundowns's players player of the season
2020-21 PFA Player of the Year

Career statistics

International

International goalsScores and results list South Africa's goal tally first.''

References

Living people
1989 births
People from Tembisa
South African soccer players
South African Premier Division players
Orlando Pirates F.C. players
South Africa international soccer players
Association football midfielders
Mamelodi Sundowns F.C. players
2015 Africa Cup of Nations players
African Games silver medalists for South Africa
African Games medalists in football
Competitors at the 2011 All-Africa Games
2019 Africa Cup of Nations players
Sportspeople from Gauteng
Cape Town All Stars players
Chippa United F.C. players